The High Point Market (formerly the International Home Furnishings Market and the Southern Furniture Market), held in High Point, North Carolina, is the largest home furnishings industry trade show in the world, with over 10 million square feet (1 km2) by roughly 2000 exhibitors throughout about 180 buildings.  The market holds two major shows each year, one in April and another in October, running one week in the Fall, and two weeks in the Spring. There are around 70,000-80,000 attendees from over 100 countries. The High Point Market Authority coordinates the exposition, whose showrooms have nearly completely filled what had been the historic downtown. A 2018 Duke University study showed that the market contributed $6.7 billion to the area's economy.

History

The first formal Southern Furniture Market was held in High Point March 1–15, 1909.  In 1921, the Southern Furniture Exposition Building opened for its first show June 20. Built in 19 months, the showroom cost approximately $1 million and held  of exhibition space. Regular shows were held in January and July.  With the exception of 1943, the market was put on hold from 1941 until the end of World War II.

The $1 million 10-story Wrenn Wing was added to the Southern Furniture Exposition Building in 1950. The center's fourth expansion is connected to older parts of the building by glass walkways over Wrenn Street. During the 1950s, informal "in-between" markets began to emerge, hosting visitors in April and October. The main markets were still held in January and July. However, the size and scope of the mid-season marketing during April and October begin to surpass the January and July shows in the 1960s.

In the 1970s, showrooms other than the Southern Furniture Exposition Building gained stature, both in size and importance.  In 1980, organizers in Dallas made a bid to host the major national home furnishings market.  In 1982, marking a complete transition, the January and July shows were discontinued, leaving the April and October shows. Also in 1982, Market Square opened in the renovated Tomlinson Chair complex. It is credited with starting the dramatic increase in showroom space that made High Point a major furniture exhibition center.

The Southern Furniture Market was renamed the International Home Furnishings Market in 1989. High Point's largest showroom, the Southern Furniture Exposition Building, changed its name to the International Home Furnishings Center, or IHFC. In the 1990s, a construction boom added an additional  of showrooms to High Point. Showroom expansion continued in 2000, with the addition of new temporary exhibit spaces: The Suites at Market Square and Showplace. A year later, the 12th floor of the IHFC opened, giving the building  of space, more than 14 times its original size.

In 2001, organizers announced the formation of the High Point Market Authority, the official organizer of the Market. The next year, the Authority approached the N.C. General Assembly for the first time in its history seeking state support for the trade show, the largest event in the state of North Carolina. In 2003, the Market Authority began a massive shuttle service that today 

supports over 300,000 riders per year. The N.C. Department of Transportation set aside $900,000 for each of the next two years so the Authority could offer free shuttles to and from 100 hotels and the Piedmont Triad International Airport, Charlotte Douglas International Airport, and Raleigh-Durham International Airport. In 2005, a new transportation terminal, the Mendenhall Transportation Center, opened in downtown High Point to anchor the Market.

In 2011, IHFC Acquisition Co. bought the IHFC for $275 million. Bassett Furniture Industries was that company's largest stockholder. SEC reports from Bassett showed a connection with The Related Cos., an investor in World Market Center. The Related Cos. was rumored to be part of a deal which would bring most of High Point's showroom space under one owner, and there were fears that the industry would move more activity to Las Vegas. At a press conference May 3, 2011, World Market Center CEO Bob Maricich and other officials of a new company announced the consolidation of what had been competing showroom facilities. International Market Centers (IMC), owned by Bain Capital and Oaktree Capital, with headquarters in both High Point and Las Vegas, bought the IHFC, Market Square and Showplace, representing about two-thirds of the city's showroom space.

In a deal completed September 26, 2017, Blackstone Real Estate Partners, Blackstone Tactical Opportunities and Fireside Investments purchased IMC, which at the time owned 14 buildings with 6.7 million square feet in High Point.

Today, the Market's 70,000-80,000 attendees include exhibitors, buyers, designers, and media in the furniture industry.  Among the High Point Market attendees transacting business are widely known figures from other arenas who participate in the home furnishings industry, including Martha Stewart, Kathy Ireland, Alexander Julian, Jonathan Adler, Oscar de la Renta, Candice Olsen, Paula Deen, Charles Spencer, and Donald Trump.

On March 12, 2020, the spring event was moved from its intended April 25–29 date to early June as a result of the ongoing COVID-19 pandemic; it was cancelled April 16.

Furniture Cluster/Niche
The High Point Market has been noted for being a significant part of the region's furniture "cluster," which was discussed by sociologist Richard Florida and initially by economist Michael Porter. The High Point Market has also been the focus of an extensive case study by urban sociologist John Joe Schlichtman.  In this research, High Point's ability to capture the global furniture merchandising market is said to signal a new era in what is possible for small cities. Along these lines, he terms High Point a "Niche City", which is "a city that forges global centrality by creating an economic specialization in a specific segment of the global service economy."

References

External links
 Market Authority site

Trade shows in the United States
Buildings and structures in High Point, North Carolina
Buildings and structures in Guilford County, North Carolina